Bowman County School District 1 is a school district headquartered in Bowman, North Dakota.

It serves Bowman and Rhame in Bowman County. It also serves a section of Slope County.

 the district had 300 elementary school students.

History

Bowman and Rhame schools consolidated in 2005.

David Mahon served as the superintendent. In summer 2018 he was removed from his position and given $90,000 in severance pay after he was charged with misdemeanors related to drug offenses. In 2019 he entered into a plea where the charges are suspended and would be expunged if he maintained good behavior for 365 days.

In 2020 the Central Elementary Public School District 32 dissolved, and was divided between Bowman County School District No. 1 and New England School District No. 9.

Schools
 Bowman County High School (7-12)
 Rhame School (K-6)
 Bowman Middle School (4-6)
 Roosevelt School (K-3)
 School of Promise (preschool)

References

External links
 Bowman County School District 1
School districts in North Dakota
Education in Bowman County, North Dakota
Slope County, North Dakota